Richard Barter (circa 1824 – 5 January 1896) was an Irish sculptor.

Life
Richard Barter was born around 1824 in Macroom, County Cork. In 1844, around the age of 20, Barter entered the Royal Dublin Society's School. While still a student in 1847, he won a prize from the Irish Art Union for his statuette Venus and Cupid. During this time, he became a friend of Daniel O'Connell. He moved to London for a few years, where he met and became life-long friends with John Henry Foley. He returned to Dublin briefly, but later moved back to County Cork, settling in St Ann's Hill, Blarney in 1853. He was also a musician, playing the flagolet.

In 1851, he exhibited as part of the Great Exhibition in London. He produced primarily portrait busts and small subject groups. In 1845, 1847 and 1851 he exhibited with the Royal Hibernian Academy, primarily miniature busts in ivory. Between 1864 and 1874 he occasionally exhibited with the Royal Academy.

Barter died at St Ann's on 5 January 1896, and is buried in St Finn Barr's Cemetery, Cork.

The Dictionary of Irish Architects assumes that Barter was the son of Dr Richard Barter, but this does not appear to be the case.

Selected works
Bust of Daniel O'Connell (1847)
Bust of Catherine Hayes (1851)
Bust of Thomas Little
Bust of Charles Stewart Parnell

References

Irish sculptors
19th-century Irish sculptors
Male sculptors
19th-century male artists
1820s births
1896 deaths